Chloé Sainte-Marie (born Marie-Aline Joyal on May 29, 1962 in Saint-Eugène-de-Grantham, Québec, Canada) is an actress, singer, activist, and official spokesperson for a network of natural caregivers in Québec.

Biography

She is equally well known as the companion, muse, and caregiver of renowned Quebec filmmaker Gilles Carle, who was diagnosed with Parkinson's disease which, over 18 years, progressively reduced his ability to move or speak. Slightly before the death of Gilles Carle in 2009, she opened the Maison Gilles-Carle, to accept chronically ill patients looking to live in a family style setting while allowing respite to their primary caregivers by sharing care for the residents amongst the caregivers.

In 2005, Charles Binamé and Amazone Film released the documentary Gilles Carle ou l'indomptable imaginaire (released in English as Gilles Carle, the untamable mind) where, as part of his exploration of the movie's subject, he chronicled Sainte-Marie's life as the companion and muse to Gilles Carle.

In 2009, she released her latest album Nitshisseniten e tshissenitamin (translated as: "I know that you know"), performed in its entirety in the Innu language. The words and music are from author-poet-composer-performer Philippe McKenzie, a fore-runner in the contemporary folk-Innu movement.

In 2012, she was interviewed on the Pénélope McQuade show about the Maison Gilles-Carle and how so many people came together to make the project a reality.

Awards 
 2003 : She received the Félix Award for Best Contemporary Folk Album for Je marche à toi (2002).
 2003 : She received the Premier Prix du public (translated as: "Grand Prize from the public" at the Festival Alors ... Chante! (France).
 2004 : She received the Révélation du festival (translated as: "Discovery of the Festival") prize at the Festival Pully.
 2006 : For the album Je marche à toi (2002), she received, from the Académie Charles-Cros the prize Coup de cœur chanson - Année de la francophonie pour le Canada (translated as: "Song from the Heart - Canada's Year of Francophony").
 2006 : She once again received a Félix Award, this time for Show of the Year - Performer for her show Parle-moi (2005).
 2010 : On February 14, 2010, Les Artistes pour la paix honoured Chloé Sainte-Marie and designated her as Artiste pour la paix de l'année 2009 (translated as: "Artist for Peace for the year 2009").

Filmography 
 1982 : Scandale
 1984 : Cinéma Cinéma (as singer)
 1984 : Le Parc (leading role)
 1985 : O Picasso (as singer)
 1985 : Le dernier havre (secondary role)
 1986 : La Guêpe (film) (leading role)
 1987 : Vive Québec (as singer)
 1989 : La terre est une pizza (leading role)
 1991 : La milliardaire (TV) (secondary role)
 1992 : Miss Moscou (TV) (leading role)
 1992 : La Postière aka "The Postmistress" (leading role)
 1996 : Pudding chômeur aka "Bread Pudding" and "Poor Man's Pudding" (leading role)
 1998 : La Penderie (leading role)
 2005 : Gilles Carle ou l'indomptable imaginaire (as self)

Discography 

 1993 : L'Emploi de mon temps
 1999 : Je pleure, tu pleures (ASIN B000GBEX0Q)
 2002 : Je marche à toi (ASIN B000GBEX10)
 2005 : Parle-moi (ASIN B000B6TS6U)
 2008 : Mon amour en furie (ASIN B001KK6RGA) Boxed set containing the 3 albums Je pleure, tu pleures, Je marche à toi and Parle-moi
 2009 : Nitshisseniten E Tshissenitamin (Je sais que tu sais) (ASIN B002M81UCK)

References

External links
 
 Official website (in French)
 Short biography (in French) on Radio Canada
 Biography (in French) at Québec Info Musique
 [ Chloé Sainte-Marie] at the All Music Guide Database
 La Maison Gilles-Carle (in French) - Hospice founded by Chloé Sainte-Marie in homage to her late companion, Gilles Carle

Canadian film actresses
Canadian television actresses
Actresses from Quebec
Canadian folk singers
Canadian women folk singers
Singers from Quebec
People from Centre-du-Québec
Living people
1962 births
French-language singers of Canada